Jamsil Students' Gymnasium is an indoor sporting arena located in Seoul, South Korea. The capacity of the arena is 7,500 and was built from November 1972 to December 1976 to host Boxing events at the 1986 Asian Games and 2-years later the same sport on the 1988 Summer Olympics, and wheelchair basketball events at the 1988 Summer Paralympics.

The arena's name is derived from the fact that it owned by the Korea University Sports Federation, and usually host university sports events, most notably the annual MBC Cup for college basketball teams.

Events
Jamsil has held a number of Esports events, including the StarCraft competitions the 2015 10th SonicTV Starleague and 2012 Tving OSL.

PWF Korea Life Attack Pro wrestling event will be held on April 27, 2014 at this venue.  A historical moment in Korean culture history as a lost sport has regained its popularity in this country.  Aside from the Olympics, it also hosted boxing events at the 1986 Asian Games, and is the home stadium for the Seoul SK Knights of the Korean Basketball League.

On 15 March 2012, general cable broadcaster JTBC held a public shoot and press conference at the Gymnasium, to showcase their new programme Shinhwa Broadcast, hosted by six-member boyband Shinhwa.

See also
 List of indoor arenas in South Korea

References

External links

1988 Summer Olympics official report. Volume 1. Part 1. p. 166.

Indoor arenas in South Korea
Venues of the 1988 Summer Olympics
Olympic boxing venues
Sports venues in Seoul
Basketball venues in South Korea
Volleyball venues in South Korea
Buildings and structures in Songpa District
Sports venues completed in 1976
1976 establishments in South Korea
Venues of the 1986 Asian Games